In computational complexity theory, S is a complexity class, intermediate between the first and second levels of the polynomial hierarchy. A language  is in  if there exists a polynomial-time predicate P such that

 If , then there exists a y such that for all z,
 If , then there exists a z such that for all y,
where size of y and z must be polynomial of x.

Relationship to other complexity classes
It is immediate from the definition that S is closed under unions, intersections, and complements. This inclusion can in fact be strengthened to ZPPNP.

Every language in NP also belongs to  For by definition, a language L is in NP, if and only if there exists a polynomial-time verifier V(x,y), such that for every x in L there exists y for which V answers true, and such that for every x not in L, V always answers false.

Karp–Lipton theorem
A version of Karp–Lipton theorem states that if every language in NP has polynomial size circuits then the polynomial time hierarchy collapses to S. This result yields a strengthening of Kannan's theorem: it is known that S is not contained in (nk) for any fixed k.

Symmetric hierarchy
As an extension, it is possible to define  as an operator on complexity classes; then . Iteration of  operator yields a "symmetric hierarchy"; the union of the classes produced in this way is equal to the Polynomial hierarchy.

References

External links

Complexity Class of the Week: S2P, Lance Fortnow, August 28, 2002.

Complexity classes